Lindores railway station served the village of Lindores, Fife, Scotland from 1909 to 1951 on the Newburgh and North Fife Railway.

History 
The station opened on 25 January 1909 by the Newburgh and North Fife Railway. The station closed to both passengers and goods traffic on 12 February 1951.

References 

Disused railway stations in Fife
Railway stations in Great Britain opened in 1909
Railway stations in Great Britain closed in 1951
Former North British Railway stations
1909 establishments in Scotland
1951 disestablishments in Scotland